Belley Cathedral (French: Cathédrale Saint-Jean de Belley) is a Roman Catholic cathedral, dedicated to Saint John the Baptist, and a national monument of France, located in the town of Belley, Ain.

It is the seat of  Bishop of Belley–Ars.

It contains organs by Cavaillé-Coll.

References

External links

Location
 

Roman Catholic cathedrals in France
Churches in Ain